David Kemper Watson (June 18, 1849 – September 28, 1918) was an American lawyer and politician who served one term as a U.S. Representative from Ohio from 1895 to 1897.

Biography 
Born near London, Ohio, Watson was graduated from Dickinson College, Carlisle, Pennsylvania, in 1871 and from the law department of Boston University in 1873.
He was admitted to the bar and commenced practice.
He served as assistant United States district attorney for the southern district of Ohio during the administration of President Arthur.

Watson was elected attorney general of Ohio in 1887 and reelected in 1889. In 1890, he successfully prosecuted the Standard Oil Company under the Sherman Antitrust Act, leading the court to dissolve the trust.
He served as special counsel for the United States in the suits brought by the Government against the Pacific railroads in 1892.

Watson was elected as a Republican to the Fifty-fourth Congress (March 4, 1895 – March 3, 1897). He was an unsuccessful candidate for reelection in 1896 to the Fifty-fifth Congress. He was appointed by President William McKinley as a member of the commission to revise and codify the laws of the United States. He resumed the practice of law.

He died in Columbus, Ohio, September 28, 1918. He was interred in Green Lawn Cemetery.

Watson was married to Louise M. Harrison, daughter of Hon. Richard A. Harrison of Columbus, Ohio, in 1873, and had a son and a daughter.

Publications

 David K. Watson (1910). The constitution of the united states: its history, application and construction. Imprenta: Chicago, Callaghan, 1910.

References

Sources

1849 births
1918 deaths
People from London, Ohio
Dickinson College alumni
Boston University School of Law alumni
Ohio lawyers
Burials at Green Lawn Cemetery (Columbus, Ohio)
19th-century American politicians
19th-century American lawyers
Republican Party members of the United States House of Representatives from Ohio